The 1912 William & Mary Orange and Black football team represented the College of William & Mary as a member of the Eastern Virginia Intercollegiate Athletic Association (EVIAA) during the 1912 college football season. Led by William J. Young in his second and final season as head coach, William & Mary compiled an overall record of 0–7 with a mark of 0–3 in conference play, placing last out of four teams in the EVIAA.

Schedule

References

William and Mary
William & Mary Tribe football seasons
College football winless seasons
William and Mary Orange and Black football